Svalbarðshreppur is a former municipality in northeastern Iceland, between Norðurþing and Langanesbyggð. The municipality was administered from Þórshöfn in the neighbouring Langanesbyggð municipality. The area is known for its salmon rivers. In March 2022, residents of Svalbarðshreppur and Langanesbyggð voted to merge the two municipalities into one, which was formalized in June 2022.

References 

Municipalities of Iceland
Northeastern Region (Iceland)